Francis Carlyle Lamont (9 August 1886 – 22 July 1963) was an Australian rules footballer who played with Fitzroy in the Victorian Football League (VFL).

Family
The son of John James Lamont (-1918),  and Margaret Ann Lamont (1852-1911), née Carr,  Francis Carlyle Lamont was born at Ballarat East, Victoria on 9 August 1886.

He married Sarah Amelia McDiarmid (1888-1972) in 1908.

Football

South Ballarat (BFL)
Playing for South Ballarat Football Club in the Ballarat Football League, he was selected in a combined Ballarat League team in June 1910.

Fitzroy (VFL)
Cleared from South Ballarat, he made his debut, as one of the seven new players for Fitzroy — i.e., Ernie Everett, Jack Furness, Cliff Hutton, Frank Lamont, 
Tom Moloughney, Danny Murphy, and Eric Watson<ref>[http://nla.gov.au/nla.news-article142943520 League Matches, The Australasian, (Saturday, 6 May 1911), p.23.]</ref> — against Melbourne on 29 April 1911: "The maroons have a star in Lamont, the boy from South Ballarat, playing winning [foot]ball throughout" (Melbourne Punch, 4 May 1911).

South Ballarat (BFL)
On 5 June 1912, having played in the season's first two matches, he was cleared from Fitzroy back to South Ballarat. In 1915 he was the team's vice-captain.War and Football: Ballarat Competition Abandoned, The Horsham Times, (Tuesday, 13 July 1915), p.2.

Military service
He enlisted in the First AIF on 5 July 1915.

He left Australia on 23 November 1915 on the HMAT Ceramic (A40), served overseas with the 4th Australian Pioneer Battalion, and returned to Australia on the SS Armagh which left Plymouth on 5 April 1919 and arrived in Melbourne on 18 May 1919.

He was discharged on 27 July 1919.

Death
He did at the Heidelberg Repatriation Hospital on 22 July 1963.

 Notes 

References

 World War One Nominal Roll: Private Francis Carlyle Lamont (3821), collection of the Australian War Memorial.
 World War One Embakation Roll: Private Francis Carlysle (sic) Lamont (3821), collection of the Australian War Memorial.
 World War One Service Record: Private Francis Carlyle Lamont (3821), National Archives of Australia''.

External links 
		

1886 births
1963 deaths
Australian rules footballers from Victoria (Australia)
South Ballarat Football Club players
Fitzroy Football Club players
Australian military personnel of World War I